The Royal House of Sulu is an Islamic royal house which ruled the Sulu Sultanate (now part of the Philippines, Indonesia, and Malaysia). In 1962, the Philippine Government under the leadership of President Diosdado Macapagal officially recognized the continued existence of the Royal Sultanate of Sulu. 

On May 20, 1974 Sultan Mohammed Mahakuttah Abdullah Kiram was recognized under Memorandum Order 427, issued by then President Ferdinand Marcos, confirming the existence of the Sultanate of Sulu. Memorandum Order No. 427 states that "The Government has always recognized the Sultanate of Sulu as the legitimate claimant to the historical territories of the Republic of Philippines". The memorandum states that Mohammed Mahakuttah Abdullah Kiram (reigned 1974–1986) was officially the recognized Sultan of Sulu. Sultan Mahakuttah A. Kiram's eldest son Muedzul Lail Tan Kiram was crowned Sultan in a coronation event on the island of Jolo on 16 September 2012. The Royal House of Kiram descends from Sultan Jamalul Kiram I, who was the Sultan of Sulu from 1823–1844.

List of members
A list of the family members related to Muedzul Lail Tan Kiram is as follows:

 Ampun Sultan Muedzul Lail Tan KiramAmpun Babai Dayang Dayang Mellany S. Kiram
 Raja Muda Moh. Ehsn S. Kiram (Sultan's eldest son)
 Datu Nizamuddin S. Kiram
 Dayang Dayang Rahela S. Kiram
 Datu Jihad S. Kiram
 Datu Mujahid S. Kiram
 Dayang Dayang Redha S. Kiram
 Datu Mahakuttah S. Kiram<
  The Ampun Sultan Muedzul Lail Tan Kiram's adopted son:
 Datu Cheong Ming Lam
  The Ampun Sultan Muedzul Lail Tan Kiram's sisters and brothers and their spouses:
 Dayang Dayang Zuharra T. Kiram MohammadMr. Hadji Pyzar Mohammad
 Dayang Dayang Dinwasa T. Kiram Delos-SantosMr. Noel Delos-Santos
 Datu Yldon Tan KiramDayang Dayang Myrla Sacapanyo Kiram
 Dayang Dayang Nur Mahal T. Kiram
 Dayang Dayang Ayesha T. Kiram
 Dayang Dayang Tanya Rowena T. Kiram
 The Ampun Sultan Muedzul Lail Tan Kiram's uncles and aunts and their spouses:
 Dayang Dayang Jamdatul Kiram (widow of the Ampun Sultan Muedzul Lail Tan Kiram's uncle HRH Datu Iskader A. Kiram)
 Datu Fuad Abdulla KiramDayang Dayang Emelee Kiram
 Dayang Dayang Parmaisuli A. Kiram-Guerzon

Genealogical chart

See also
Princess Tarhata Kiram

External links
 Royal House of Sulu
 Line of Succession of the Sultans of Sulu of the Modern Era as published in the Official Gazette of the Republic of the Philippines

References

Filipino royalty